Creek (aka Dubai Creek) is a rapid transit station on the Green Line of the Dubai Metro in Dubai, UAE. It serves as the western terminus of the line.

The station officially opened on 1 March 2014. The Green Line was initially designed to terminate at Dubai Healthcare City, but an extension was added to Dubai Creek via Al Jadaf metro station. According to Gulf News in 2014, the plan to further extend the Green Line to Academic City is fully approved, in order to better serve the interests of residents in the Silicon Oasis and International City area. The Mohammed Bin Rashid Library is close to the station on Dubai Creek.

Al Jaddaf Marine Transport Station

The Al Jaddaf Marine Transport Station close to the Creek metro station is run by the Dubai Roads and Transport Authority (RTA), operating ferries on Dubai Creek itself. This includes an Abra boat service across the Creek to the mall at Dubai Festival City.

References

External links
 

Railway stations in the United Arab Emirates opened in 2014
Dubai Metro stations